The Boy Who Couldn't Stop Dreaming is the sixth studio album by Swedish band Club 8.

Track listing
 "Jesus, Walk With Me"
 "Whatever You Want"
 "Football Kids"
 "Hopes And Dreams"
 "Everything Goes"
 "Heaven"
 "When I Come Around"
 "Leave The North"
 "In The Morning"
 "Sometimes"
 "Where Birds Don't Fly"
 "The Boy Who Couldn't Stop Dreaming"

References

2007 albums
Club 8 albums
Labrador Records albums